Fenton Glacier is a glacier that drains south into Mosby Glacier just east of Mount Adkins in Palmer Land, Antarctica. It was mapped by the United States Geological Survey from ground surveys and U.S. Navy air photos, 1961–1967, and was named by the Advisory Committee on Antarctic Names for Lieutenant Ernest R. Fenton, U.S. Navy, Officer-in-Charge of Palmer Station in 1971.

References 

Glaciers of Palmer Land